Kaczynos  is a village in the administrative district of Gmina Stare Pole, within Malbork County, Pomeranian Voivodeship, in northern Poland.

The village has a population of 387.

References

Kaczynos